Yakov Fyodorovich Melnikov (January 13, 1896, Moscow, Russian Empire – July 12, 1960, Moscow, RSFSR, USSR) was a Russian and Soviet speed skater. The first was awarded to Honored Master of Sports of the USSR (1934).

He was the bronze medalist of the 1923 World Allround Speed Skating Championships. Melnikov set 27 national records.

He first started in the Russian championship in 1913. He last went on the ice as a participant in the country's championship in 1941. The last champion and record holder of the Russian Empire. The first champion of the RSFSR.

References

External links
 Яков Фёдорович Мельников. Всё о России и про Россию
  Рязанская энциклопедия
 Skater names starting with M

Russian male speed skaters
Soviet male speed skaters
Speed skaters from Moscow
Honoured Masters of Sport of the USSR
Burials at Novodevichy Cemetery
1896 births
1960 deaths
World Allround Speed Skating Championships medalists